Anthony Lazzaro (born August 26, 1963) is a NASCAR and sports car racing driver.  He is usually classified as a NASCAR road course ringer; however, he has made other starts in the Nextel Cup Series. He also has open-wheel oval racing experience.

Racing career
Lazzaro started in karting, winning numerous World Karting Association championships between 1987 and 1992.

Lazzaro came-up through the open-wheel ranks, first racing in the Olds Pro Series in 1993, winning at Road Atlanta, Watkins Glen, Dallas and again at Road Atlanta. He won the pole at Mid Ohio and a podium finish of third with other podium finishes at the Moroso National S2000 and at Trois Rivieres.  He was also the Hooter Formula Cup Champion in 1995, winning 6 of the 14 races and 9 poles.

As a rookie in 1996, in the Toyota Atlantic Series, he won the race at the Milwaukee Mile. He won races in 1997 (Homestead-Miami Speedway) and 1998 (Road America, Laguna Seca Raceway, Houston). His rise culminated in a Toyota Atlantic championship in 1999. That year he won 4 races (Nazareth, Gateway International Raceway, Trois-Rivieres, Laguna Seca Raceway).

Lazzaro first began racing stock cars in the ARCA in 1999. At the ARCA event at the Talladega Superspeedway that year, Lazzaro was injured in a multi-car wreck late in the race after he made contact with Bill Baird and spun down to the grass, before his Thunderbird lifted off the ground and slammed the Turn 3 banking before being t-boned by Skip Smith. Lazzaro suffered a compression fracture of the thoracic T3 vertebra in the crash that eliminated half a dozen cars.

In 2000, Lazzaro raced ten Busch Series races for PPI Motorsports.  He was planned to move up to Cup with the #96 McDonald's team.  However, after a lack of results, he was released, and replaced by Andy Houston.

Besides the stint in the Busch Series, Lazzaro has raced mainly road course races, giving him the label of a road course ringer.

He also made 6 starts in the Indy Racing League in 2001 and 2002 for Sam Schmidt Motorsports with a best finish of 9th.

In addition, Lazzaro has had success in sports car racing. He won the GT3 class in the 24 Hours of Daytona in 1999, co-driving a Porsche 911. In 2002 he finished third in the SPII class after winning seven races. In 2003 he was fifth at the GT class of the American Le Mans Series, collecting six podiums with a Risi Ferrari 360. He took a GT win in the 2004 race at Lime Rock Park with Ralf Kelleners and ended seventh in the GT class. He made his debut in the 24 Hours of Le Mans in 2003, also racing a Ferrari.

In 2013, Lazzaro got three podiums in the LMP2 class of the ALMS with Extreme Speed Motorsports. He also competed in the Rolex Sports Car Series driving a GT class Ferrari 458. With four podiums, he ended fourth in the drivers championship. He switched to the SCCA World Challenge for 2014, where he races a Ferrari 458.

Motorsports career results

SCCA National Championship Runoffs

American Open Wheel
(key)1995 Hooters Formula Cup champion with 6 wins and 9 pole positions.

Indy Racing League

(key) (Races in bold indicate pole position)

Complete 24 Hours of Le Mans results

NASCAR
(key) (Bold – Pole position awarded by qualifying time. Italics – Pole position earned by points standings or practice time. * – Most laps led.)

Nextel Cup Series

Busch Series

Craftsman Truck Series

ARCA Bondo/Mar-Hyde Series
(key) (Bold – Pole position awarded by qualifying time. Italics – Pole position earned by points standings or practice time. * – Most laps led.)

WeatherTech SportsCar Championship results
(key)(Races in bold indicate pole position, Results are overall/class)

References

External links
 
Anthony Lazzaro at Risi Competizione
Anthony Lazzaro at Driver Database
Anthony Lazzaro at Race Database
Anthony Lazzaro at Speedsport Magazine

1963 births
24 Hours of Daytona drivers
24 Hours of Le Mans drivers
American Le Mans Series drivers
ARCA Menards Series drivers
Atlantic Championship drivers
IndyCar Series drivers
Living people
NASCAR drivers
Sportspeople from Charleston, South Carolina
Racing drivers from South Carolina
Trans-Am Series drivers
Rolex Sports Car Series drivers
WeatherTech SportsCar Championship drivers
SCCA National Championship Runoffs winners
24 Hours of Spa drivers
Blancpain Endurance Series drivers
U.S. F2000 National Championship drivers
GT World Challenge America drivers
Extreme Speed Motorsports drivers
Arrow McLaren SP drivers
DragonSpeed drivers
Le Mans Cup drivers